The Aland was a four-cylinder 2.5-liter 16-valve, single OHC automobile with diagonally connected four-wheel internal expanding brakes and aluminum pistons. It was made in Detroit, Michigan, by the Aland Motor Car Company from 1916 to 1917. Two- and five-seater versions were available for $1500.

See also
Brass Era car

References

External links
Photo of 1917 Aland Four tourer

Vintage vehicles
Defunct motor vehicle manufacturers of the United States
Motor vehicle manufacturers based in Michigan
Defunct manufacturing companies based in Detroit